Acacia leptalea, commonly known as Chinocup wattle, is a shrub belonging to the genus Acacia and the subgenus Phyllodineae that is endemic to a small area in south western Australia. It is listed as threatened according to the Environment Protection and Biodiversity Conservation Act 1999.

Description
The dense rounded shrub typically grows to a height of  It has shortly haired branchlets with raised leaf bases. Like most species of Acacia it has phyllodes rather than true leaves. It produces simple inflorescences with yellow flowers between July and October.

Taxonomy
The species was first formally described by the botanist Bruce Maslin in 1999 as part of the work Acacia miscellany. The taxonomy of fifty-five species of Acacia, primarily Western Australian, in section Phyllodineae (Leguminosae: Mimosoideae) as published in the journal Nuytsia. It was reclassified as Racosperma leptaleum by Leslie Pedley in 2003 then transferred back to genus Acacia in 2006.

Distribution
It is native to a small area around Chinocup, close to Nyabing, in the Great Southern region of Western Australia, where it often grows along drainage lines and on undulating plains in sandy to loamy soils. There is estimated to be a total population of approximately 550 plants, but it is thought to have been far more widespread prior to clearing for agriculture.

See also
List of Acacia species

References

leptalea
Acacias of Western Australia
Taxa named by Bruce Maslin